Eugene Bareman (born May 21, 1979), is a New Zealand mixed martial arts trainer. He is a former professional mixed martial artist and kickboxer. He is the head trainer and founder of City Kickboxing.

Early life
Bareman was born in New Zealand to a Dutch father and Samoan mother, as one of three children. He started training in mixed martial arts to get into shape to play rugby. He studied in law school in Auckland, before dropping out in second year to focus on fighting.

Career 
Bareman had an unassuming career as an amateur kickboxer.  He started fighting in local kickboxing tournaments in 2001, and mixed martial arts in 2006. As of 5 July 2018, Bareman fought in 48 fights across different disciplines.

Bareman founded City Kickboxing with the former boxer Doug Viney in his local city Auckland, New Zealand in 2007. Bareman and City Kickboxing made their names in 2018, with the successes of their fighters Israel Adesanya and Dan Hooker. After both Adesanya and Alexander Volkanovski claimed UFC championships in 2019, Bareman and City Kickboxing were named as the Coach of the Year and the Gym of the Year, respectively, by MMAJunkie.com.

Bareman and City Kickboxing repeated as Coach of the Year and the Gym of the Year in 2020.

Mixed martial arts record

|-
| Win
| align=center| 4–3
| Aaron Forsterling
| Decision (unanimous)
| Nitro MMA 10
| 
| align=center|3
| align=center|5:00
| Logan City, Australia
|
|-
| Loss
| align=center|3–3
| Gareth Ealey
| Submission (rear-naked choke)
| Shuriken MMA
| 
| align=center|1
| align=center|1:01
| Auckland, New Zealand
|
|-
| Loss
| align=center|3–2
| Tyler Manawaroa
| Decision (unanimous)
| Warriors Realm 15
| 
| align=center|3
| align=center|5:00
| Gladstone, Australia
|
|-
| Loss
| align=center|3–1
| Rodney MacSwain
| TKO (leg injury)
| Supremacy Fighting Championship 4
| 
| align=center|1
| align=center|0:15
| Auckland, New Zealand
|
|-
| Win
| align=center| 3–0
| Steve Kennedy
| Submission (rear-naked choke)
| ETK Thai Boxing
| 
| align=center| N/A
| align=center| N/A
| Auckland, New Zealand
|
|-
| Win
| align=center| 2–0
| Graeme Glidden
| Submission (rear-naked choke)
| Kiwi King of the Ring
| 
| align=center| 1
| align=center| 3:01
| Tauranga, New Zealand
|
|-
| Win
| align=center| 1–0
| James Griffiths
| Submission (kimura)
| Carnage in the Cage
| 
| align=center| 1
| align=center| N/A
| Auckland, New Zealand
|

References

External links
 

1979 births
Living people
Sportspeople from Auckland
New Zealand male mixed martial artists
Mixed martial arts trainers
Welterweight mixed martial artists
New Zealand practitioners of Brazilian jiu-jitsu
New Zealand sportspeople of Samoan descent
New Zealand people of Dutch descent